The First National Bank of Adams is a historic commercial building on Main Street in Adams, Minnesota, United States.  Built in 1924, it was designed by the noted Prairie School architects Purcell & Elmslie.  The interior of the building includes a mural by John W. Norton. The building also housed the village council chambers and was later operated as a municipal liquor store and known as the Adams Municipal Liquor Store.  It was listed on the National Register of Historic Places in 1986.

Adams Area History Center
In 2018, the Adams Area Historical Society established the Adams Area History Center in the First National Bank Building to commemorate Adams' sesquicentennial. The History Center is home to a variety of collections and research materials.

References

External links

 Adams Area Historical Society and History Center

Bank buildings on the National Register of Historic Places in Minnesota
Buildings and structures in Mower County, Minnesota
Commercial buildings completed in 1924
National Register of Historic Places in Mower County, Minnesota
Purcell and Elmslie buildings